Muy Muy is a municipality in the Matagalpa department of Nicaragua.

The municipality of Muy Muy was named by the Matagalpa people, who were the indigenous group native to the area. In their native language "muimui" translates to "the best" (sp. los mejores). Translated to Spanish it's "very very", and in nawat it translates to "otter", which were once found in abundance in the region.

References

Municipalities of the Matagalpa Department